The 28th Academy Awards were held on March 21, 1956 to honor the films of 1955, at the RKO Pantages Theatre in Los Angeles, California. 

At just 90 minutes, Marty became the shortest film to win Best Picture, as well as the second to have also won the Palme d'Or at the Cannes Film Festival (after The Lost Weekend in 1945).

This was the final year in which the Best Foreign Language Film was a Special/Honorary award. Beginning with the 29th Academy Awards, it became a competitive category.



Awards

Nominees were announced on February 18, 1956. Winners are listed first and highlighted in boldface.
{| class=wikitable
|-
! style="background:#EEDD82; width:50%" |  Best Motion Picture
! style="background:#EEDD82; width:50%" |  Best Director
|-
| valign="top" |
 Marty – Harold Hecht for United Artists Love Is a Many-Splendored Thing – Buddy Adler for 20th Century Fox  
 Mister Roberts – Leland Hayward for Warner Bros. 
 Picnic – Fred Kohlmar for Columbia Pictures  
 The Rose Tattoo – Hal B. Wallis for Paramount Pictures  
| valign="top" |
 Delbert Mann – Marty John Sturges – Bad Day at Black Rock
 Elia Kazan – East of Eden
 Joshua Logan – Picnic
 David Lean – Summertime
|-
! style="background:#EEDD82" |  Best Actor
! style="background:#EEDD82" |  Best Actress
|-
| valign="top" |
 Ernest Borgnine – Marty as Marty Piletti James Cagney – Love Me or Leave Me as Martin Snyder
 James Dean (posthumous nomination) – East of Eden as Caleb Trask
 Frank Sinatra – The Man with the Golden Arm as Frankie "Dealer" Machine
 Spencer Tracy – Bad Day at Black Rock as John J. Macreedy
| valign="top" |
 Anna Magnani – The Rose Tattoo as Serafina Delle Rose Susan Hayward – I'll Cry Tomorrow as Lillian Roth
 Katharine Hepburn – Summertime as Jane Hudson
 Jennifer Jones – Love Is a Many-Splendored Thing as Dr. Han Suyin
 Eleanor Parker – Interrupted Melody as Marjorie Lawrence
|-
! style="background:#EEDD82" |  Best Supporting Actor
! style="background:#EEDD82" |  Best Supporting Actress
|-
| valign="top" |
 Jack Lemmon – Mister Roberts as Ensign Frank Thurlowe Pulver Arthur Kennedy – Trial as Bernard Castle
 Joe Mantell – Marty as Angie
 Sal Mineo – Rebel Without a Cause as John "Plato" Crawford
 Arthur O'Connell – Picnic as Howard Bevans
| valign="top" |
 Jo Van Fleet – East of Eden as Cathy Ames/Kate Trask Betsy Blair – Marty as Clara
 Peggy Lee – Pete Kelly's Blues as Rose Hopkins
 Marisa Pavan – The Rose Tattoo as Rosa Delle Rose
 Natalie Wood – Rebel Without a Cause as Judy
|-
! style="background:#EEDD82" |  Best Screenplay
! style="background:#EEDD82" |  Best Story and Screenplay
|-
| valign="top" |
 Marty – Paddy Chayefsky from Marty by Paddy Chayefsky Bad Day at Black Rock – Millard Kaufman from "Bad Time at Honda" by Howard Breslin
 Blackboard Jungle – Richard Brooks from Blackboard Jungle by Evan Hunter
 East of Eden – Paul Osborn from East of Eden by John Steinbeck
 Love Me or Leave Me – Daniel Fuchs and Isobel Lennart
| valign="top" |
 Interrupted Melody – William Ludwig and Sonya Levien The Court-Martial of Billy Mitchell – Milton Sperling and Emmet Lavery
 It's Always Fair Weather – Betty Comden and Adolph Green
 Mr. Hulot's Holiday – Jacques Tati and Henri Marquet
 The Seven Little Foys – Melville Shavelson and Jack Rose
|-
! style="background:#EEDD82" | Best Motion Picture Story
! style="background:#EEDD82" | Best Documentary Feature
|-
| valign="top" |
 Love Me or Leave Me – Daniel Fuchs The Private War of Major Benson – Joe Connelly and Bob Mosher
 Rebel Without a Cause – Nicholas Ray
 The Sheep Has Five Legs – Jean Marsan, Henri Troyat, Jacques Perret, Henri Verneuil, and  Raoul Ploquin
 Strategic Air Command – Beirne Lay Jr.
| valign="top" |
 Helen Keller in Her Story Heartbreak Ridge
|-
! style="background:#EEDD82" | Best Documentary Short Subject
! style="background:#EEDD82" | Best Live Action Short Subject, One-Reel
|-
| valign="top" |
 Men Against the Arctic – Walt Disney The Battle of Gettysburg
 The Face of Lincoln
| valign="top" |
 Survival City – Edmund Reek 3rd Ave. El – Carson Davidson
 Gadgets Galore – Robert Youngson
 Three Kisses – Justin Herman
|-
! style="background:#EEDD82" | Best Live Action Short Subject, Two-Reel
! style="background:#EEDD82" | Best Short Subject – Cartoons
|-
| valign="top" |
 The Face of Lincoln 24-Hour Alert
 The Battle of Gettysburg
 On the Twelfth Day
 Switzerland
| valign="top" |
 Speedy Gonzales Good Will to Men
 The Legend of Rockabye Point
 No Hunting
|-
! style="background:#EEDD82" | Best Scoring of a Dramatic or Comedy Picture
! style="background:#EEDD82" | Best Scoring of a Musical Picture
|-
| valign="top" |
 Love Is a Many-Splendored Thing – Alfred Newman Battle Cry – Max Steiner
 The Man with the Golden Arm – Elmer Bernstein
 Picnic – George Duning
 The Rose Tattoo – Alex North
| valign="top" |
 Oklahoma! – Robert Russell Bennett, Jay Blackton and Adolph Deutsch Daddy Long Legs – Alfred Newman
 Guys and Dolls – Jay Blackton and Cyril J. Mockridge
 It's Always Fair Weather – André Previn
 Love Me or Leave Me – Percy Faith and Georgie Stoll
|-
! style="background:#EEDD82" | Best Song
! style="background:#EEDD82" | Best Sound Recording
|-
| valign="top" |
 "Love Is a Many-Splendored Thing" from Love Is a Many-Splendored Thing – Music by Sammy Fain; Lyrics by Paul Francis Webster "I'll Never Stop Loving You" from Love Me or Leave Me – Music by Nicholas Brodszky; Lyrics by Sammy Cahn
 "Something's Gotta Give" from Daddy Long Legs – Music and Lyrics by Johnny Mercer
 "The Tender Trap" from The Tender Trap – Music by Jimmy Van Heusen; Lyrics by Sammy Cahn
 "Unchained Melody" from Unchained – Music by Alex North; Lyrics by Hy Zaret
| valign="top" |
 Oklahoma! – Fred Hynes Love Is a Many-Splendored Thing – Carlton W. Faulkner
 Love Me or Leave Me – Wesley C. Miller
 Mister Roberts – William A. Mueller
 Not as a Stranger – Watson Jones
|-
! style="background:#EEDD82" | Best Art Direction, Black-and-White
! style="background:#EEDD82" | Best Art Direction, Color
|-
| valign="top" |
 The Rose Tattoo – Art Direction: Hal Pereira and Tambi Larsen; Set Decoration: Samuel M. Comer and Arthur Krams Blackboard Jungle – Art Direction: Cedric Gibbons and Randall Duell; Set Decoration: Edwin B. Willis and Henry Grace
 I'll Cry Tomorrow – Art Direction: Cedric Gibbons and Malcolm Brown; Set Decoration: Edwin B. Willis and Hugh Hunt
 The Man with the Golden Arm – Art Direction: Joseph C. Wright; Set Decoration: Darrell Silvera
 Marty – Art Direction: Ted Haworth and Walter M. Simonds; Set Decoration: Robert Priestley
| valign="top" |
 Picnic – Art Direction: William Flannery and Jo Mielziner; Set Decoration: Robert Priestley Daddy Long Legs – Art Direction: Lyle R. Wheeler and John DeCuir; Set Decoration: Walter M. Scott and Paul S. Fox
 Guys and Dolls – Art Direction: Oliver Smith and Joseph C. Wright; Set Decoration: Howard Bristol
 Love Is a Many-Splendored Thing – Art Direction: Lyle R. Wheeler and George Davis; Set Decoration: Walter M. Scott and Jack Stubbs
 To Catch a Thief – Art Direction: Hal Pereira and Joseph McMillan Johnson; Set Decoration: Samuel M. Comer and Arthur Krams
|-
! style="background:#EEDD82" | Best Cinematography, Black-and-White
! style="background:#EEDD82" | Best Cinematography, Color
|-
| valign="top" |
 The Rose Tattoo – James Wong Howe Blackboard Jungle – Russell Harlan
 I'll Cry Tomorrow – Arthur Arling
 Marty – Joseph LaShelle
 Queen Bee – Charles Lang
| valign="top" |
 To Catch a Thief – Robert Burks Guys and Dolls – Harry Stradling
 Love Is a Many-Splendored Thing – Leon Shamroy
 A Man Called Peter – Harold Lipstein
 Oklahoma! – Robert Surtees
|-
! style="background:#EEDD82" | Best Costume Design, Black-and-White
! style="background:#EEDD82" | Best Costume Design, Color
|-
| valign="top" |
 I'll Cry Tomorrow – Helen Rose The Pickwick Papers – Beatrice Dawson
 Queen Bee – Jean Louis
 The Rose Tattoo – Edith Head
 Ugetsu – Tadaoto Kainosho
| valign="top" |
 Love Is a Many-Splendored Thing – Charles LeMaire Guys and Dolls – Irene Sharaff
 Interrupted Melody – Helen Rose
 To Catch a Thief – Edith Head
 The Virgin Queen – Charles LeMaire and Mary Wills
|-
! style="background:#EEDD82" | Best Film Editing
! style="background:#EEDD82" | Best Special Effects
|-
| valign="top" |
 Picnic – Charles Nelson and William Lyon Blackboard Jungle – Ferris Webster
 The Bridges at Toko-Ri – Alma Macrorie
 Oklahoma! – Gene Ruggiero and George Boemler
 The Rose Tattoo – Warren Low
| valign="top" |
 The Bridges at Toko-Ri' The Dam Busters The Rains of Ranchipur|}

Best Foreign Language FilmSamurai, The Legend of Musashi (Japan)

Presenters and performers

Presenters
Ernest Borgnine (Presenter: Best Story & Screenplay)
James Cagney (Presenter: Best Special Effects)
Cantinflas (Presenter: Cinematography Awards)
Maurice Chevalier (Presenter: Best Original Song)
Mel Ferrer and Claire Trevor (Presenter: Scientific and Technical Awards)
Susan Hayward (Presenter: Costume Design Awards)
Audrey Hepburn (Presenter: Best Motion Picture)
Jennifer Jones (Presenter: Best Director)
Grace Kelly (Presenter: Best Actor)
Peggy Lee and Jack Lemmon (Presenters: Art Direction Awards)
Jerry Lewis (Presenter: Best Film Editing and Best Actress)
Anna Magnani (Presenter: Best Screenplay)
Sal Mineo (Presenter: Best Sound Recording)
Edmond O'Brien (Presenter: Best Supporting Actress)
Eleanor Parker (Presenter: Documentary Awards)
Marisa Pavan, Arthur O'Connell and Jo Van Fleet (Presenters: Short Subjects Awards)
Frank Sinatra and Jerry Lewis (Presenters: Best Music Score Awards)

Performers
Harry Belafonte ("Unchained Melody" from Unchained)
Maurice Chevalier ("Something's Gotta Give" from Daddy Long Legs)
Eddie Fisher ("Love Is a Many-Splendored Thing" from Love Is a Many-Splendored Thing)
Dean Martin ("(Love Is) The Tender Trap" from The Tender Trap)
Jane Powell ("I'll Never Stop Loving You" from Love Me or Leave Me)

Multiple nominations and awards

These films had multiple nominations:8 nominations: Love Is a Many-Splendored Thing, Marty and The Rose Tattoo6 nominations: Love Me or Leave Me and Picnic4 nominations: Blackboard Jungle, East of Eden, Guys and Dolls, I'll Cry Tomorrow, and Oklahoma!3 nominations: Bad Day at Black Rock, Daddy Long Legs, Interrupted Melody, The Man with the Golden Arm, Mister Roberts, Rebel Without a Cause, and To Catch a Thief2 nominations: The Battle of Gettysburg, The Bridges at Toko-Ri, The Face of Lincoln, It's Always Fair Weather, Queen Bee, and SummertimeThe following films received multiple awards.4 wins: Marty3 wins: Love Is a Many-Splendored Thing and The Rose Tattoo2 wins: Oklahoma! and Picnic''

See also
13th Golden Globe Awards
1955 in film
 7th Primetime Emmy Awards
 8th Primetime Emmy Awards
 9th British Academy Film Awards
 10th Tony Awards

References

Academy Awards ceremonies
1955 film awards
1955 awards in the United States
1956 in Los Angeles
1956 in New York City
1956 in American cinema
March 1956 events in the United States
Events in New York City
1950s in Manhattan